New Alamein, is a new city in northwest Egypt inaugurated by Egyptian President Abdel Fattah el-Sisi on 1 March 2018. New Alamein lies on the Mediterranean Sea, approximately 85 km west of Borg El Arab International Airport. Still under construction, New Alamein was conceived by the Egyptian government as a center for tourism, education, and government. The city has its own presidential palace and ministry building. Construction is ongoing at New Alamein for three universities, fifteen skyscrapers and high rise towers, and 10,000 hotel rooms. Work has begun on Phase II of the New Alamein megaproject, which includes ten additional coastal towers.

History 
Egyptian President Abdel-Fattah al-Sisi inaugurated New Alamein on March 1, 2018. Together with the as-yet-unnamed New Administrative Capital, which is set to replace Cairo as Egypt's capital, New Alamein is one of the mega-projects of the al-Sisi government. Abu Dhabi Crown Prince Sheikh Mohammed bin Zayed Al Nahyan toured the construction sites in New Alamein in March 2019. Completed projects include a mega-mall, restaurants, three cinemas, and the Al Masa mosque.

Economy 
The Egyptian government intends for New Alamein to bring large numbers of tourists to the Mediterranean beaches of the northwest coast. The government asserts that approximately 30 developers have been granted permits to move forward with the construction of hotels for 30,000 rooms. Many of these units are in high-rise buildings along the beach, with towers already under construction including The North Edge Towers and The Gate projects. Other centers of activity in New Alamein will include three universities and a "city of culture and arts" to encompass a Roman Theater, studio complexes, an opera hall, and a cinema complex.

Unlike the resorts on the northwest coast, which have private beaches sealed from public access, New Alamein is conceived as being an open city permitting entry to the general public.

Skyscrapers and Towers under-construction

Future Proposed Towers

See also

 El Alamein
 El Alamein Fountain (war memorial commemorating the battle, in Sydney, Australia)
 El Alamein International Airport
 Enham Alamein (village in Hampshire in England, renamed after the battle)
 Marina El Alamein (tourist resort)

References 

Cities in Egypt
Planned cities
New towns in Egypt
Populated places in Matrouh Governorate